Peter Vronsky is a Canadian author, filmmaker, and investigative historian. He holds a PhD in criminal justice history and espionage in international relations from the University of Toronto.  He is the author of the bestseller true crime histories Serial Killers: The Method and Madness of Monsters (2004), Female Serial Killers: How and Why Women Become Monsters and Sons of Cain: A History of Serial Killers From the Stone Age to the Present (2018), a New York Times Editors' Choice, and most recently  American Serial Killers: The Epidemic Years 1950–2000 (2021), a history exploring the epidemic surge of serial killers in the second half of the 20th century. He is the director of several feature films, including Bad Company (1980) and Mondo Moscow (1992). Vronsky is the creator of a body of formal video and electronic artworks and new media. He has also worked professionally in the motion picture and television industry as a producer and cinematographer in the field of documentary production and news broadcasting with CNN, CTV, CBC, RAI and other global television networks in North America and overseas.  Vronsky's 2011 book, Ridgeway: The American Fenian Invasion and the 1866 Battle That Made Canada, is the definitive history of Canada's first modern battle – the Battle of Ridgeway  fought against Irish American Fenian insurgents who invaded across the border from the United States on the eve of Canadian Confederation shortly after the American Civil War. He currently lectures at Toronto Metropolitan University's History Department in the history of international relations, terrorism, espionage, American Civil War, and the Third Reich.  He consults as an investigative criminal historian to a number of law enforcement cold case homicide units including the NYPD, New York State Police, and Bergen County Prosecutor's Office New Jersey.

1970s 
Peter Vronsky was a writer and film reviewer for Canada's national film magazine Cinema Canada and University of Toronto's The Varsity. He was a member of Toronto Filmmakers Coop and University of Toronto Film Board (Hart House). He studied with Canadian film directors Don Shebib, Clarke Mackey, and Peter Pearson at the Toronto Filmmakers Coop.  Vronsky dropped out of the University of Toronto at the end of his second year to pursue filmmaking full-time. He wrote and directed two thirty-minute short drama films starring Paul Young from the Cardboard Brains: American Nights (1976) and The Sheep-Eaters (1977). He received several Canada Council and Ontario Arts Council Grants and directed and produced a thirty-minute music documentary special on punk rock for CBC television Crash'n'Burn (Dada's Boys) (1977) with the Viletones, Teenage Head, Dishes, The Ramones and The Deadboys, filmed at CBGB in New York and the New Yorker Theater and Crash'n'Burn in Toronto; (Not to be confused with Ross McLaren's independent Crash 'n' Burn made the same year on the same subject). Vronsky produced and directed a feature film, Bad Company (1980).  He worked as an assistant-director on Canadian feature films:  Nothing Personal (1979), The Last Chase (1979) and Screwballs (1981). Vronsky frequently collaborated with documentary filmmaker Peter Lynch on Video Culture International projects and with horror film director Tibor Takacs who before he left for Hollywood worked as a D.O.P. and Art Director on several Vronsky films.

1980s 
Peter Vronsky created numerous video art tapes and formal video installations exhibited in Canada and internationally in Tokyo, Paris, Rome, Amsterdam, New York, and London.  He was the Artist-in-Residence with Sony Corporation at Video/Culture International, 1983. He frequently worked as an undercover video specialist – field producer with CBC's The Fifth Estate and CTV's W5. In 1984–1985 during the pioneering period of laserdisc development, Vronsky was the Head of Interactive Laser Optical Software Development, Sony Corporation-Video/Culture and the Project Director of the Berlin Wall Videodisc, Sony Canada-Image Over Time, 1985. He worked as a Field Producer/Cameraman for CNN International, Rome Bureau, 1986–1990.  Vronsky was the Producer-director of Russian Rock Underground (1988), a thirty-minute music television special on underground ("unofficial") rock music in the Soviet Union, featuring Boris Grebenshchikov, Televizor, Zvuki Mu and Auktion.

1990s 
Vronsky was the writer-producer-director of Mondo Moscow, a feature-length documentary on incipient Stalinism and underground culture in the USSR, 1990.  In 1991, Vronsky investigated Lee Harvey Oswald's activities in the USSR in 1959–1962 and was the first Westerner ever to interview Oswald's friends, lovers and acquaintances in Russia. Vronsky was the cameraman-line producer on The Hunt for Red Mercury, an investigative one-hour documentary (Discovery Channel – CTV) on nuclear weapons material smuggling in Chechnya, 1992.  He was the writer-director of The Uncanadians, a NFB feature documentary 1994–1995 (but withdrew his name from the director's credit in a dispute with the National Film Board over the film's controversial contents). Vronsky was the Head of English Language Production, Panavideo, Venice Italy – service producer for Italy's national television network, RAI, 1997–1999.

2000s 
Vronsky was the Queens Park/Toronto Bureau Chief at E-Press, Canada's first online news streaming service, 2000 and the Broadband Content Specialist, Canada-Invest.com, financial news streaming service, 2000–2001. He was the Director of Photography on the feature-length music documentaries, Life Could Be A Dream (Bravo Television, 2002) and I'll Fly Away Home (Bravo Television, 2004). He authored two crime history books, Serial Killers The Method and Madness of Monsters (Berkley-Penguin Books, 2004) and Female Serial Killers:  How and Why Women Become Monsters (Berkley-Penguin Books, 2007). Vronsky returned to the University of Toronto as a full-time student from 2003 to 2010, completing the following degrees:
 University of Toronto, Trinity College, Honours B.A., 2003.
 University of Toronto, Graduate School, M.A. (History) 2004.
 University of Toronto, Graduate School, Ph.D. (History), 2010.

In 2015, Leah McLaren, writing in The Globe and Mail, reported on the strange disappearance in Cambodia of Dave Walker, a friend of Vronsky's.  According to McLaren, Vronsky was working hard to determine what happened to Walker, when the Canadian government seemed to want his story to be forgotten.  Walker had told Vronsky that he had worked as an advisor for the Canadian Security Intelligence Service (CSIS) ferreting out genocidal Khmer Rouge perpetrators infiltrating Canada among legitimate refugees from Cambodia during the 1980s and 1990s.  Vronsky suspected this could have played a role in his death in Cambodia.

Currently 
Vronsky is currently writing American Werewolf: The Life and Crimes of Richard Cottingham, the Last Serial Killer on the Left based on a series of prison interviews he is conducting with the notorious serial killer Richard Cottingham.  In January 2020, Vronsky revealed that Cottingham who has been incarcerated since 1980 in the Trenton State Prison for six murders committed between 1967–1980, had recently confessed to an additional three unsolved murders of school girls in New Jersey 1968–1969.

Vronsky currently lectures at Toronto Metropolitan University's History Department in international relations, American Civil War, Third Reich, espionage and the history of terrorism.  In 2017, he was chosen as the Writer-In-Residence at the Toronto Public Library. He recently appeared in Joe Berlinger's new Netflix show, Crime Scene (Season 2): The Times Square Killer (2021) about the 1979–80 torso murders in New York committed by serial killer Richard Cottingham who Vronsky is in the midst of interviewing since 2018.

Peter Vronsky is fluent in English, Russian and Italian and resides in Toronto, Canada, and Venice, Italy.

References

External links 
 Peter Vronsky Home Page:  CV, Streaming Video Excerpts, Websites, etc
 Peter Vronsky YouTube Channel
 Books by Peter Vronsky
 Battle of Ridgeway 1866
 Sons of Cain Table of Contents

Year of birth missing (living people)
Artists from Toronto
20th-century Canadian historians
Canadian male non-fiction writers
Canadian multimedia artists
Canadian people of Russian descent
Canadian video artists
Film directors from Toronto
Living people
Writers from Toronto
21st-century Canadian historians